Henrik Furuseth (Eidsvoll April 24, 1996) is a Norwegian racing driver. He won the U.S. F2000 National Championship in the National Class in 2012.

Racing career

Henrik started karting when he was 6 years old.  He raced his way through the ranks until 2010. In 2010 he made his formula racing debut in the Norwegian Formula Basic. He was ranked third in the championship in his Ford powered Van Diemen. In his second season in Formula Basic he not only won the Norwegian championship but also the Norwegian cup.

In 2012 he made his debut in American autosport in the U.S. F2000 National Championship. Henrik raced for Cape Motorsports w/ Wayne Taylor Racing in a Mazda powered Van Diemen DP06 Formula Enterprises.  He took his first win in the second race of the season at Sebring.  During his debut season he took another six wins and a total of nine podium finishes. But it took until the last round of the season to secure the championship over Mark Eaton.

For 2013 Henrik made the switch to the Championship class in the U.S. F2000 National Championship racing for PRL Motorsports which also made its debut in the Championship class after having competed in the National class. He finished fourth in Championship class points with a pair of second-place finishes in Houston as his best finish. In 2014 he moved to JAY Motorsports and slid to tenth in points with only a single podium finish, a third place at the Mid-Ohio Sports Car Course

Personal

His older brother Sindre Furuseth is a Norwegian rally driver. Their father Vidar Furuseth is the owner of Furuseth Motorsport which runs Sindre's rally car. Anders Krohn manages and coaches Henrik Furuseth as of 2012.

U.S. F2000 National Championship

References

External links
 Furuseth Motorsport

Norwegian racing drivers
1996 births
People from Eidsvoll
Living people
U.S. F2000 National Championship drivers
Sportspeople from Viken (county)
Wayne Taylor Racing drivers